In East Asian Buddhism, the Twelve Heavenly Generals or Twelve Divine Generals are the protective deities, or yaksha, of Bhaisajyaguru, the buddha of healing. They are introduced in the Medicine Buddha Sutra  or Bhaiṣajyaguruvaidūryaprabharāja Sūtra.
They are collectively named as follows:

Names of generals
The precise names of the generals seem to vary depending on tradition. Those listed below are from an available Sanskrit transcription of the Bhaiṣajyaguruvaiḍūryaprabhārāja Sūtra:

While the Honji and zodiac correspondences listed above are the standard in Japanese sources, there is variation among texts and regional traditions.

Popular culture
 Statues of the Twelve Heavenly Generals stand in Ngong Ping, Hong Kong.
 The Heavenly Generals and their names were used as character material for the powerful digital monster characters who serve the "Four Holy Beasts" (Digimon Sovereigns in the English Dub) in the Digital World, from the 2001 series Digimon Tamers, albeit with the names mismatched, due to being based on the Japanese zodiac classification.
 Granblue Fantasy started to release series of playable units in 2015 which called "The 12 Divine Generals". Each of these units are named after the corresponding zodiac they represent. The Japanese version use adapted Hepburn romanization, while the English version adapted from Sanskrit.

References

External links
 Album of 12 Heavenly Generals at Ngong Ping

Yakshas
 
Shingon Buddhism
War gods
Bhaiṣajyaguru Buddha